"Help Me, Rhonda" is a song by American rock band the Beach Boys, appearing first on their 1965 album The Beach Boys Today! (where it was spelled "Help Me, Ronda") and subsequently in re-recorded form on the following 1965 album Summer Days (And Summer Nights!!). It was written by Brian Wilson, with additional lyrics by Mike Love. Unlike many other songs by the band from this period, "Help Me, Rhonda" features a lead vocal sung by Al Jardine.

According to Wilson, "Help Me, Rhonda" was not based on a real person. After being released as an album track on Today!, Wilson revisited the song, feeling it had commercial potential. This new version, featuring a different arrangement and slightly different lyrics, was released as a single in April 1965 and appeared on Summer Days later that same year. It topped the Billboard Hot 100, making it their second number-one single following "I Get Around" (1964). It remains one of the band's most acclaimed singles commercially and critically.

Background
"Help Me, Rhonda" was written by Brian Wilson with additional lyrics by Mike Love. In his memoir, Wilson claimed the song was inspired by Bobby Darin's "Mack the Knife", which he was playing on the piano when he came up with the music for "Help Me Rhonda". He has also cited "Fannie Mae" as an inspiration.

The lyrics tell a story of a man who was attracted to a woman who then found another man; to aid the healing process, he begs a woman named Rhonda to help him get over her. According to Brian Wilson, "Rhonda" was not based on a real person. The song's lead vocalist Al Jardine confirmed that Wilson had told him the song was fictional, though he commented, "I'm sure there was something down there in the psychology of it. ... We didn't really get into the meaning of the lyrics. They spoke for themselves."

Mike Love cited the song as one where "maybe he [Brian Wilson] had a chorus idea" and Love would "come up with the lyrics to help finish off and complete the song." Of the lyrics, Love joked, "There are a lot of people, a lot of girls named Rhonda out there who have gotten remarks related to that song all their lives."

Recording
Though Brian Wilson initially intended to perform the lead vocal for the song himself, he instead assigned the part to Al Jardine. Brian Wilson later stated, "I'd heard Al sing a lot and liked his voice and wanted to write a song for him that showed off the quality of his voice and sure enough I did." Jardine, who had only sung one lead vocal for the band up to that point, struggled with his vocal, recalling,

According to Jardine, he and Brian Wilson conflicted over Jardine's delivery of the lyric "Rhonda, you look so fine". Jardine explained, "I think the part that was hard was the length of 'fine', that was the part, to be specific with you. It could have been sung quicker or longer, and I just heard it longer and he heard it shorter. I think it kind of came out halfway in between [laughs]."

The vocal overdub session for the second version of this song was notable for resulting in a particularly heated confrontation between Wilson and his father Murry, who at the time had been dismissed as the group's manager for nearly a year but was still present in the studio on occasion. After Murry continually critiqued and ridiculed the group's singing throughout each take, Brian complained and got into a tense argument which ultimately led to a physical altercation over control of the soundboard. The unedited session tape has been extensively copied and shared among Beach Boys fans.

Release
Two versions of "Help Me, Rhonda" were released commercially in 1965. The first version, recorded in January 1965 and featuring a ukelele-driven arrangement, was included on the band's The Beach Boys Today! album under the title "Help Me, Ronda". Jardine characterized this version as "more of a laid-back shuffle" and said it "definitely wasn't a single." Mike Love similarly recalled that he "didn't anticipate" the song would become a "breakout hit". Brian Wilson, however, felt the song had hit potential and the band rerecorded the track in 1965 with a punchier, guitar-led arrangement and some minor lyrical tweaks.

Released as a single in March 1965, the "Help Me, Rhonda" rerecording was a commercial smash hit, reaching number one in the US and knocking the Beatles' "Ticket to Ride" from the top spot. It was the band's second number one and the first since 1964's "I Get Around". In the aftermath of its chart success, the new track was then included on the band's next studio album, Summer Days (And Summer Nights!!). Brian Wilson recalled, "That was one of the hits that Capitol wanted."

The song would also appear on several compilation albums, among them 1967's Best of the Beach Boys Vol. 2 and 1974's Endless Summer, with the latter featuring the original recording from the Today! album.

Critical reception
Upon release, Billboard described the single version as "an intriguing off-beat rouser" which "can't miss."  Cash Box described it as "a power-packed hard-driving romantic surfin’-rocker with an extremely infectious danceable back-beat."  Wilson later said of the song, "I would've made a better rhythm — it wasn't in the pocket."

"Help Me, Rhonda" continues to attract critical acclaim. Writers from Paste Magazine and The Guardian included the song on their lists of the best Beach Boys songs, with the former publication calling the song Brian Wilson's "finest pre-Pet Sounds track." In a retrospective review, William Ruhlmann of AllMusic said of the song, "It remains one of the best examples of [Brian] Wilson's ability to turn the turmoil of his life into stirring music."

Personnel

Today! version
Per Craig Slowinski.

The Beach Boys

Al Jardine – lead vocals
Mike Love – harmony and backing vocals
Brian Wilson – harmony and backing vocals
Carl Wilson – harmony and backing vocals, 12-string electric guitar
Dennis Wilson – harmony and backing vocals

Additional musicians and production staff

Bill Pitman – electric guitar
Glen Campbell – 12-string acoustic guitar
Billy Strange – ukulele
Ray Pohlman – bass guitar
Leon Russell – grand piano
Hal Blaine – drums, timbales
Julius Wechter – claves
Billy Lee Riley – double-reed harmonica
Steve Douglas – tenor saxophone
Plas Johnson – tenor saxophone
Jay Migliori – baritone saxophone
Chuck Britz – engineer
 unknown – tambourine (possibly Ron Swallow)

Summer Days version
Per Craig Slowinski.

The Beach Boys
Al Jardine – lead vocals
Mike Love – harmony and backing vocals
Brian Wilson – harmony and backing vocals, upright piano, Hammond B-3 organ
Carl Wilson – harmony and backing vocals, 12-string guitar
Dennis Wilson – harmony and backing vocals, tambourine 

Additional musicians and production staff

Billy Strange – 12-string guitar
Glen Campbell – electric guitar
Barney Kessel – ukulele
Carol Kaye – bass guitar 
Larry Knechtel – Wurlitzer electronic piano
Don Randi – grand piano 
Hal Blaine – drums, timbales
Steve Douglas – tenor saxophone
Plas Johnson – tenor saxophone
Jay Migliori – baritone saxophone
Chuck Britz – engineer

Charts

List of later versions 

 1970 – Roy Orbison, The Big O.
 1975 – Johnny Rivers, New Lovers And Old Friends (with an assist from Brian Wilson on back-up vocals); reached #22 on the Billboard Hot 100.

Notes

References

1965 singles
The Beach Boys songs
Jan and Dean songs
1975 singles
Johnny Rivers songs
Billboard Hot 100 number-one singles
Cashbox number-one singles
RPM Top Singles number-one singles
Songs written by Brian Wilson
Songs written by Mike Love
Song recordings produced by Brian Wilson
Song recordings with Wall of Sound arrangements
Capitol Records singles
1965 songs

es:Help Me, Ronda#Help Me, Rhonda (Relanzamiento)